Newell G. Bringhurst (born 3 April 1942) is an American historian and author of books and essays. Most of his writings have been about Mormonism— particularly topics and figures of controversy, such as blacks and the priesthood, Fawn Brodie, polygamy, and schisms within the LDS movement

Bringhurst taught history and political science for 35 years at the College of the Sequoias in Visalia, California, and is now a professor emeritus.

Biography
Bringhurst was born in Salt Lake City, Utah. He received a B.S. degree from the University of Utah in 1965, and completed his master's degree studies in 1967 with a thesis on George H. Dern.

Bringhurst became a history department lecturer at San Jose State University in 1972, where he taught for three years. He was awarded a Ph.D. in history from the University of California at Davis in 1975. He was hired the following year by Boise State University as an instructor of history. He joined the faculty at Indiana University at Kokomo as an assistant professor of history in 1977.

Bringhurst joined the Mormon History Association in 1972, and served as its president in 1999–2000. He was appointed as MHA Historian in 2002. He has been involved with The John Whitmer Historical Association since the mid-1970s, and served as its president from 2005–2006.

Personal life
Bringhurst has been married since the mid-1970s, and has one daughter. He has expressed an enjoyment for hiking and other outdoor activities.

Bringhurst has been described as a "cultural Mormon and a liberal Democrat".

Accolades
In 2005, the John Whitmer Historical Association's Special Book Award was granted to Bringhurst and his co-editor Lavina Fielding Anderson for Excavating Mormon Pasts: The New Historiography of the Last Half Century.

In 2021, Bringhurst received the Leonard J. Arrington Lifetime Contribution Award from the Mormon History Association.

Publication

Books

. Republished on 24 January 1997 by Longman. .

 Expanded and updated volume released on 11 September 2011. .

Essays and articles

 Republished in Bush Jr., Lester E.; Mauss, Armand L., eds. (1984). Neither White nor Black: Mormon Scholars Confront the Race Issue in a Universal Church. Midvale, Utah: Signature Books. 

 Also included in The Prophet Puzzle: Interpretive Essays on Joseph Smith edited by Bryan Waterman (15 February 1999). Signature Books. .

 Republished in Taysom, Stephen C., ed. (15 June 2011) Dimensions of Faith: A Mormon Studies Reader. Salt Lake City: Signature Books. .

 Sillito, John R.; Staker, Susan, eds. (2002). Mormon Mavericks: Essays on Dissenters. "Fawn McKay Brodie and Her Quest for Independence" by Newell G. Bringhurst. Salt Lake City, Utah: Signature Books. .

References

External links

1942 births
American male non-fiction writers
American historians of religion
American Latter Day Saint writers
American bibliographers
College of the Sequoias faculty
Historians of the Latter Day Saint movement
Historians of race relations
Latter Day Saints from Utah
Latter Day Saints from California
Latter Day Saints from Indiana
Latter Day Saints from Idaho
Living people
University of Utah alumni
University of California, Davis alumni